Palladium(II) nitrate is the inorganic compound with the formula Pd(NO3)2.(H2O)x where x = 0 or 2.  The anhydrous and dihydrate are deliquescent solids.  According to X-ray crystallography, both compounds feature square planar Pd(II) with unidentate nitrate ligands.  The anhydrous compound, which is a coordination polymer, is yellow.

As a solution in nitric acid, Pd(NO3)2 catalyzes the conversion of alkenes to dinitrate esters.  Its pyrolysis affords palladium oxide.

Preparation
Hydrated palladium nitrate may be prepared by dissolving palladium oxide hydrate in dilute nitric acid followed by crystallization. The nitrate crystallizes as yellow-brown deliquescent prisms. The anhydrous material is obtained by treating palladium metal with fuming nitric acid.

References

Nitrates
Palladium compounds
Oxidizing agents